James Carnegie of Finavon or Findhaven (died 10 March 1707) was a member of the Parliament of Scotland.

The second son of David Carnegie, 2nd Earl of Northesk, he was infeft on 6 June 1672. By contract of 10 February and June 1674, he married Anna Lundin, second daughter of Dame Margaret Lundin of that Ilk and Robert Maitland, brother of the Duke of Lauderdale. Their children were:
 Charles, who was "palsied" and died without issue in 1712
 James, the second son, in whose favour Carnegie executed an entail on 13 September 1703
 Margaret, who married Patrick Lyon of Auchterhouse
 Jean, who married her first cousin Alexander Blair of Kinfauns, Perthshire; their daughter Margaret married John Gray, 11th Lord Gray.
Anna Carnegie died on 3 September 1694.

Carnegie of Finavon represented Forfar from 1669 to 1674. He was made captain of a new company in the Scots Regiment of Guards on 25 August 1674 and served at the Battle of Bothwell Bridge before resigning his commission in 1680. He then served as commissioner for Forfarshire in 1686, from 1698 to 1702, and again from 1702 to 1707.

He died at Edinburgh and was buried in the Abbey Church.

References
 Sir James Balfour Paul, The Scots Peerage, volume VI (Edinburgh, 1909) pages 497-499
 Charles Dalton, The Scots Army 1661-1688 (London and Edinburgh, 1909) Part II, page 22, note 1
 Joseph Foster, Members of Parliament, Scotland' (London and Aylesbury, 1882) page 65

1707 deaths
Shire Commissioners to the Parliament of Scotland
Scots Guards officers
Year of birth unknown
Members of the Parliament of Scotland 1669–1674
Members of the Parliament of Scotland 1685–1686
Members of the Parliament of Scotland 1689–1702
Members of the Parliament of Scotland 1702–1707
Younger sons of earls